Interlomas is an exclusive residential and commercial area in State of Mexico, Mexico, located  west of Mexico City's historic center and about  north of the Santa Fe edge city. Interlomas is a high class zone, compound by various colonies (neighborhoods) with really high incomes, it belongs to the municipality of Huixquilucan in the State of Mexico. As of 2011, it has a population of approximately 170,000.

The district is home to numerous shopping centers. The first major shopping center on the area was Centro Comercial Interlomas, which was established on 1992. Further major shopping centres were developed over the next two decades, such as Magnocentro Interlomas, La Piazza and Paseo Interlomas, which is the largest shopping center in the area with anchor department stores El Palacio de Hierro, Sears, and a landmark Liverpool, completed in 2011 and noted for its architecture, rooftop "park" and nicknamed "the UFO" for its shape.

Interlomas has about 500 buildings of 15 stories or higher. The majority of these buildings are composed of upscale apartments, but in recent years there has been a development of large office complexes and financial centers in the area.

Interlomas is connected to exurban areas to the north and south by the Autopista Chamapa-La Venta and to Mexico City itself by the thoroughfares Avenida de los Bosques, Paseo de la Herradura, and Bosques de Minas.

Education

Interlomas is home to a considerable amount of private schools, as well as an important private university Universidad Anahuac Mexico Norte
Escuela Sierra Nevada Interlomas Campus
Colegio El Roble Interlomas
The Wingate School Huixquilucan campus (opening 2017)

Jewish community
In the 1950s, 60s, and 70s, the majority of Mexico City's Jews moved from Condesa, Roma and the Downtown to Polanco, Lomas de Chapultepec, Interlomas, Bosques de las Lomas, and Tecamachalco, where the majority are now based.

References

Neighborhoods in the State of Mexico
Jewish communities in Mexico
Huixquilucan
Edge cities in Mexico